Immunoglobulin superfamily member 8 is a protein that in humans is encoded by the IGSF8 gene. IGSF8 has also been designated as CD316 (cluster of differentiation 316).

References

Further reading

External links
 

Clusters of differentiation